Phyllonorycter umukarus is a moth   of the family Gracillariidae. It is found in south-western Rwanda in open clearings in montane wet forests at an altitude of about 1,800 meters.

The length of the forewings is 2.95–3.14 mm. The forewings are ochreous with golden shine and with shiny silver white markings. The hindwings are greyish beige with a long fringe of the same shading as the hindwings. Adults are on wing in early August.

The larvae feed on Triumfetta cordifolia.

Etymology
The specific epithet is derived from the vernacular adjective umukara, meaning "black" in Kirwanda, referring to the large black band between the first and second forewing fasciae.

References

Moths described in 2012
umukarus
Moths of Africa

Lepidoptera of Rwanda
Taxa named by Jurate de Prins